The Esemka Bima is a series of pickup trucks and vans manufactured by the Indonesian carmaker Esemka. It is the first product that being mass-produced by the company, mainly locally assembled at Solo Manufaktur Kreasi (SMK, pronounced "esemka" in Indonesian) manufacturing facility in Boyolali, Central Java for pickup truck models. The Bima was launched on 6 September 2019. A total of 26 local component manufacturers supplied parts for the pickup, including INKA. The company claimed the Bima is built with 60–62 percent of locally produced parts. Despite being built locally, the blueprint design of the Bima is allegedly identical to the Changan, Jinbei, and Shineray pickup trucks, although the company did not confirm this explicitly.

The battery electric van variant was launched on 16 February 2023 at the 30th Indonesia International Motor Show as the Bima EV. Based on the 1.3 model, it is imported from China instead of being manufactured locally for study and technology transfer reasons.

History 

The Bima nameplate was first registered in 2012, along with the Rajawali SUV. Esemka claimed that they would be partnered with Chinese carmakers Chery and Foday to build the car at the time. The Bima was proposed to be a low-cost pickup truck equipped with a 1.1-litre petrol engine and would be targeted to rural farmers. Later in 2013, 40 units of the Bima and Rajawali had been delivered.

References

External links 
  (Bima 1.2)
  (Bima 1.3)

Vehicles introduced in 2019
2020s cars
Pickup trucks
Rear-wheel-drive vehicles
Production electric cars
Electric vans
Cab over vehicles